This was the first edition of the tournament.

Nathaniel Lammons and Fernando Romboli won the title after defeating João Domingues and Pedro Sousa 7–6(7–4), 6–1 in the final.

Seeds

Draw

References

External links
 Main draw

Ludwigshafen Challenger - Doubles
2019 in German tennis